A compression release mechanism works to ease the starting of internal combustion engines by allowing them to spin up to starting speed without having to work against the pumping action of the pistons. It does this through a release valve that is incorporated within the cylinder head that vents the cylinder pressure to the outside atmosphere until the engine has sufficient momentum to overcome it. At that point the valve closes and the ignition is engaged.

Motorcycles
Early large displacement motorcycles provided riders with a manual control for this when kick starters were used while later models linked them to the kick start lever through a cable for automatic operation. Though it only uses electric start, not kick start, the 2012 Ducati 1199 uses a compression release, which is automatically activated at low engine speed by a centrifugal flyweight on each exhaust cam.

From the mid-1960s to the late-1970s, engine compression releases were also used to supplement rear wheel braking on many two-stroke engined motorcycles, primarily those used off-road or for various types of dirt-track racing, such as motocross and flat-tracking.  Since two-stroke engines normally lack the compression braking effect of four-stroke engines when the throttle is shut off, the addition of a compression release brake on two-strokes essentially mimicked the four-stroke compression braking effect. Using throttle-off engine compression for at least some braking on both two-stroke and four-stroke motorcycles was especially important during that era, since most motorcycles used drum brakes, which fade more quickly than modern disc brakes.

Diesel engines

Small diesel engines may be fitted with compression release valves if they are to be started by hand cranking.

Automation
US patent US5375570 A of 1994 describes an automated compression release valve actuated by engine oil pressure.

See also
 Engine braking

Notes

Internal combustion engine technology
Starting systems